Xiaozuo may refer to:

 Xiaozuo, Hui'an County (小岞镇), town in Hui'an County, Fujian, China
 Xiaozuo, Jingxing County (小作镇), town in Hebei, China